1923 in Argentine football saw Boca Juniors win its 3rd title, the Asociación Argentina championship while San Lorenzo achieved its first title ever at the top division winning the Asociación Amateur championship.

Primera División

Asociación Argentina de Football - Copa Campeonato
Boca Juniors and Huracán finished with 51 points each so they had to play the playoffs to decide a champion. Palermo, which had been relegated from the Asociación Amateur, joined Asociación Argentina remaining at Primera División. Argentino de Quilmes returned to the top division after being relegated in 1918, while All Boys, Argentino de Banfield and Villa Urquiza made their debuts in Primera.

Final playoffs

With the third match drawn, the best-of-three series was level at 1-1, meaning a fourth match - to be played to a finish - was required to determine the champion.

Asociación Amateur de Football
Argentino del Sud (promoted last year) debuted in Primera División.

Lower divisions

Primera B
AFA Champion: Boca Juniors II
AAm Champion: Liberal Argentino

Primera C
AFA Champion: Bristol
AAm Champion: Acassuso

Domestic cups

Copa Dr. Carlos Ibarguren
Champion: Boca Juniors

Final

International cups

Copa Campeonato del Río de la Plata
Champion: San Lorenzo

Final

References

 
Seasons in Argentine football
1923 in association football
1923 in South American football